Thomas Ryan Smith is an English professional footballer who plays as a left back for Stowmarket Town.

Club career

Ipswich Town
Smith made his first-team debut for the club on 4 December 2019, appearing as a second half substitute in a 1–1 away draw with Peterborough United in an EFL Trophy second round match, which Ipswich went on to win 5–6 on penalties. He signed his first professional contract on the 25 February 2020.

Stowmarket Town

On 16 June 2022, Smith signed for Isthmian League club Stowmarket Town.

Career statistics

References

External links

2001 births
Living people
Sportspeople from Bury St Edmunds
Footballers from Suffolk
English footballers
Association football defenders
Association football fullbacks
Ipswich Town F.C. players